Bray Jazz Festival is an Irish jazz music festival that takes place in Bray, Ireland, on the May bank holiday weekend. The festival celebrated its 20th anniversary on 3–5 May 2019, and featured performances by John Scofield, Norma Winstone, Anja Lechner and Francois Couturier, and pianist Marc Copland, who was a late addition to the line up following an illness which forced the scheduled performance by pianist Fred Hersch.

The event has established a reputation as Ireland's leading contemporary jazz music festival event, and as an event that showcases and premieres new European jazz. In 2019 Bray Jazz staged first Irish performances by Switzerland's Lucia Cadotsch Speak Low, by French band No Tongues, Dutch trio Tin Men & The Telephone and Swedish saxophonist Mats Gustafsson's Fire!, among others.

To mark its 20th birthday Bray Jazz launched a new 'On the Road' strand to its 2019 programme, and presented concerts across [County Wicklow}] at notable heritage sites and venues, including [Russborough House], [Calary Church], [Arklow Methodist Church] and [Tinahely Courthouse Arts Centre.]

Bray Jazz was established in 2000 with part-funding from Ireland's National Millennium Fund.

Although boutique in scale, Bray Jazz has featured many of the leading name jazz and world music players from Ireland and abroad since it was first established .

The festival is now one of the main cultural highlights on Ireland's jazz calendar, and has been described by The Irish Times as 'the connoisseurs jazz festival', and as 'one of the very best small jazz festival's in Europe (All About Jazz).

Bray Jazz Festival announced in early Spring 2020 that it was taking 'time out' after 20 years, to review its activities and seek to put the event on a sustainable trajectory for the future. As a result, it would not host a festival event in 2020, but was planning to reimagine the event and return with its 21st edition, in 2021. Subsequently, the COVID-19 outbreak meant that it could not have taken place anyhow, as all such events and gatherings were cancelled in Ireland in Spring/Summer of 2020.

History

Bray Jazz 2019
Participants includedJohn Scofield, Marc Copland, Anja Lechner and Francois Couturier, Mats Gustafsson Fire!, Lucia Cadotsch Speak Low, Tin Man & The Telephone, [No Tongues], [Norma Winstone] @ Tommy Halferty and [George Colligan], amongst others.

Bray Jazz 2018
Participants includedJoe Lovano and Dave Douglas Quintet: Sound Prints, with Joey Baron, Linda Oh and Lawrence Fields; pianist Bobo Stenson and singer China Moses, cellist [Ernst Reijseger], drummer Jim Black, and saxophonist Ingrid Laubrock with Mary Halverson and Tom Rainey, amongst others.

Bray Jazz 2017
The 18th edition of Bray Jazz Festival featured performances by British big band Beats & Pieces, emerging Swedish saxophonist Malin Wattring and Australia's The Necks, and West African guitarist Lionel Loueke.  Denmark's The Firebirds, Switzerlands Pilgrim, Estonia's Maarja Nuut Norway's Stian Carstensen, India's Shantala Subramanyam and Irish group Roamer, amongst others.

Bray Jazz 2016
The 17th edition of Bray Jazz Festival included performances by American pianist Kenny Werner, West African Grammy Award winning singer Dobet Gnahoré, and Swedish drummer Magnus Ostrom, formerly of e.s.te.  A new church venue, The Well, featured concerts by Swiss group Vein featuring saxophonist Greg Osby, by Irish jazz composer and bassist Ronan Guilfoyle with 'A Shy Going Boy', and a solo piano recital featuring Mexican pianist Alex Mercado.  Elsewhere, Norwegian hardanger fiddle player Nils Okland, Scottish harpist Catriona McKay, and a host of other names played.

Bray Jazz 2015
Bray Jazz Festival 2015 will feature concert performances by young American trumpeter Ambrose Akinmusire and by Brazilian jazz soul star Ed Motta.  Dublin City Jazz Orchestra will be conducted by Pete Churchill and joined by guest soloists Lauren Kinsella and Laura Jurd for a concert performances that honours the music of Kenny Wheeler.  Other acts playing this year's festival include Sue Rynhart and Dan Bodwell, Francesco Turrisi's The Tacquin Experiments, Havana Che and the National Concert Hall Gamelan Orchestra Khai Jati Rosa.

Bray Jazz 2014
The 15th Bray Jazz Festival featured performances by New York-based trumpeter and composter Dave Douglas and pianist Uri Caine, by Brazilian guitarist Vinicius Cantuaria and by exciting new Norwegian saxophone talent Marius Neset.  The performance by Dave Douglas was the first instance that a headline artist has returned to the festival.  Other artists billed included the celebrated multi-national folk/trad quartet This is How we Fly,  Indian classical players Joyeeta and Debajoti Sanyal and by other acts including Edel Meade, Hugh Buckley, Karovka, Booka Brass Band, Square Pegs, Toot Sweet, Zaska, JCQ and Manden Express.

Bray Jazz 2013
The 14th Bray Jazz Festival featured New York-based Brazilian singer and pianist Eliane Elias, Norwegian bass player Mats Eilertsens Skydive, Christy Dorans New Bag, French trumpeter Médéric Collignon, as well as Swedish duo Norrland, Brass Jaw from Scotland, and a Balkan showcase featuring four leading Balkan and klezmer bands - Yurodny, Paprika, She'Koyokh and North Strand Kontra Band.  The festival will also stage shows featuring Swiss cajun trio Mama Rosin, and by some of the best-known names in Irish contemporary jazz.

Bray Jazz 2012
The 13th installment of Bray Jazz Festival took place on the May Weekend, 2012, and featured concerts by two-time Grammy Award winning South American singer Susana Baca from Peru,  by the Tord Gustavsen Trio (Norway),  by US clarinetist Don Byron's New Gospel Quintet,  and by Warsaw Village Band (Poland), Mari Kvien Brunvoll (Norway), Matthias Loibner (Austria), and a host of leading name Irish jazz groups and musicians.

Bray Jazz 2011
The 12th Bray Jazz Festival featured concert appearances by award-winning Brazilian players Hamilton de Holanda & André Mehmari, by celebrated American jazz guitarist Kurt Rosenwinkel Quartet, and by a host of other international and home grown acts including Christine Tobin & Liam Noble, The Artvark Saxophone Quartet, guitar prodigy Andreas Varady, Tcha Limberger's Kalotaseg Trio, and Snowboy and The Latin Section.

Bray Jazz 2010

The festival's 2010 event featured guitar-led performances, including shows by the Wayne Krantz Trio (US), Wolfgang Muthspiel's trio (Austria/US), John Etheridge's Sweet Chorus (UK), Norwegian duo Trygve Seim and Frode Haltli, and Brazil's Trio Corrente.

Bray Jazz 2009
The 10th annual Bray Jazz Festival was staged on the weekend of 1–3 May 2009.
Featured artists included :

 Stefon Harris & Blackout (USA)
 Mathias Eick Quartet (Norway)
 Trio Sud featuring Sylvain Luc(France)
 Tarab (Italy)
 Boi Akih (Indonesia/Netherlands)
 Rez Abbasi Quartet (with Kiran Ahluwalia) (USA)
 Eri Yamamoto Trio (Japan/USA)
 Orquestra do Fuba (Brazil)
 Justin Adams & Juldah Kamara (UK/Gambia)
 Yurodny (Irl)
 Morla (Irl)
 Sardjoe/Buckley/Guilfoyle (Irl/Ind)
 Tommy Halferty French Trio (Irl/Fr)
 Soweto Kinch & David Lyttle Trio (UK/Irl)

Bray Jazz 2008
Bray Jazz Festival 2008 featured performances by:

 Mare Nostrum (Fr/Italy/Sweden)
 Maceo Parker Band with Dennis Rollins (USA/UK)
 Orchestre National de Jazz (France)
 Liu Fang (China)
 Zahr (Italy)
 Norma Winstone & Tommy Halferty (UK/Irl)
 Carmen Souza Band (Cape Verde/Portugal)
 Ibrahim Electric (Denmark)
 Havana Son (Irl/Cuba)
 Dafnis Prieto Sextet (USA)
 Togetherness (Ireland)
 Fuzzy Logic & Tom Arthurs (Irl/UK)
 Touché (Denmark)
 The Electric Miles Davis (Irl)
 Yurodny (Irl)

References

External links
 Official website
 Journal of Music Ireland reviews Bray Jazz 2006
 Journal of Music Ireland reviews Bray Jazz 2008
 The Irish Times reviews Bray Jazz 2008
Ireland reviews Bray Jazz 2008]
 The Irish Times reviews Bray Jazz 2008
 Irish Times interviews Fred Hersch 2019
 Things to Do in Ireland on May Weekend
 All About Jazz reviews Bray Jazz 2009

Bray
Recurring events established in 2000
Jazz Festival